Hallux varus is a deformity of the great toe joint where the hallux (great toe) is deviated medially (towards the midline of the body) away from the first metatarsal bone. The hallux usually moves in the transverse plane. Unlike hallux valgus, also known as hallux abducto valgus or bunion, hallux varus is uncommon in the West but it is common in cultures where the population remains unshod.

Photos

References

External links 

Foot diseases